List of broadcasters of the UEFA European Championship qualifying and European section of the FIFA World Cup qualifiers (branded as "European Qualifiers" by UEFA), UEFA Nations League and several friendly matches organized by UEFA. The rights also includes the final matches at the end of UEFA Nations League season.

2022–2028 
From 2022 onwards, the rights will be effectively until the UEFA Euro 2028 due to additional two years extension.

UEFA

– RTBF broadcasts in French and VTM in Dutch.
– Channel 4 exclusively broadcasts all England matches live.
– S4C exclusively broadcasts all Wales matches live until 2024.
– Contract originally awarded to Premier Sports before being bought by Viaplay. Under this contract, Viaplay exclusively broadcasts all Scotland and Northern Ireland matches live until 2024.
– Viaplay will exclusively broadcast all Scotland, Wales and Northern Ireland matches live from 2024.

Rest of the world

– Only available in countries without broadcasting deals.

See also
UEFA Euro 2020 broadcasting rights

References

2018 FIFA World Cup qualification (UEFA)
Qualifiers
UEFA Nations League